Kuri may refer to:

People
 Aren Kuri (born 1991), a Japanese baseball player
 Daniel Ludlow Kuri (born 1961), a Mexican politician 
 Emile Kuri (1907–2000), Mexican-American film set decorator
 Ippei Kuri (born 1940), a Japanese manga artist
 Jean Succar Kuri (born 1944), convicted Mexican businessman 
 John A. Kuri, an American author and writer
 Yōji Kuri (born 1928), a Japanese cartoonist and filmmaker
 Kuri Kikuoka (Takagi Michinokuo, 1909–1970), pen-name of a Japanese author of poetry and novels
 Kuri Prathap, an Indian film actor

Places

Iran
Kuri, Bushehr
Kuri, Dashti, Bushehr Province
Kuri, Fars
Kuri, Kermanshah
Kuri, Khuzestan
Kuri Rural District, Bushehr Province

Other countries
Kuri, Estonia
Koru, Turkey (formerly known as Kuri)
Kuri, India
Kuri, Bhopalgarh, India
Kuri, Varanasi, India
Kuri railway station, Kollam district, Kerala, India
Kuri, ICT, Pakistan
Kuri Bay, Western Australia

Other uses
Kurī, the Māori name for the Polynesian dog
Kuri cattle, a breed of cattle
Kuri (kitchen), the kitchen of a Zen monastery
, the Japanese Chestnut
Kuri language (disambiguation)
Red Kuri, a cultivar of winter squash.

See also

Kury (disambiguation)
Kuris (disambiguation)
Khouri, or Khoury, a surname
Koori, indigenous Australian people from New South Wales and Victoria
Kurree, a village in Punjab, Pakistan

Japanese masculine given names
Japanese-language surnames